The 64th Pennsylvania House of Representatives District is located in northwest Pennsylvania and has been represented by R. Lee James since 2013.

District Profile 
The 64th District encompasses parts of Crawford County and all of Venango County and includes the following areas:

Crawford County

Hydetown
Oil Creek Township
Rome Township
Steuben Township
 Titusville
Townville
Troy Township

Venango County

Representatives

Recent election results

References

External links 

 District map from the United States Census Bureau
 Pennsylvania House Legislative District Maps from the Pennsylvania Redistricting Commission.
 Population Data for District 64 from the Pennsylvania Redistricting Commission.

Government of Butler County, Pennsylvania
Government of Venango County, Pennsylvania
64